Fun Time is a 1975 live album by Count Basie and his orchestra, recorded at the 1975 Montreux Jazz Festival.

Track listing
"Fun Time" (Sammy Nestico) – 3:28
"Why Not?" (Hefti) – 3:29
"Lil' Darlin" (Hefti) – 5:32
"In a Mellow Tone" (Duke Ellington, Milt Gabler) – 5:39
"Body and Soul" (Frank Eyton, Johnny Green, Edward Heyman, Robert Sour) – 6:33
"Good Times Blues" (Ernie Wilkins) – 5:44
"I Hate You Baby" (Bill Caffey, Billy Grey, Heard) – 4:44
"Lonesome Blues" (Caffey) – 1:50
"Whirley Bird" (Hefti) – 9:54
"One O'Clock Jump" (Count Basie) – 1:59

Personnel
The Count Basie Orchestra
 Count Basie - piano
 Sonny Cohn - trumpet
 Frank Szabo
 Pete Minger
 Dave Stahl
 Bobby Mitchell
 Bill Hughes - trombone
 Curtis Fuller 
 Mel Wanzo - trombone
 Al Grey
 Bobby Plater - alto saxophone
 Danny Turner
 Eric Dixon - tenor saxophone
 Jimmy Forrest
 Charlie Fowlkes - baritone saxophone
 Freddie Green - guitar
 John Duke - double bass
 Butch Miles - drums
 Bill Caffey - Vocals

References

1975 live albums
Count Basie Orchestra live albums
Albums recorded at the Montreux Jazz Festival
Pablo Records live albums
Albums produced by Norman Granz